Sister Miriam Joseph Rauh, C.S.C., PhD (1898–1982) was a member of the Sisters of the Holy Cross. She received her doctorate from Columbia University and was Professor of English at Saint Mary's College from 1931 to 1960. She is the author of several books including The Trivium (1937), a text she developed as part of the core curriculum of Saint Mary's College.  In her preface to the 1947 edition, she writes, "This book owes its inception .. to professor Mortimer J. Adler of the University of Chicago, whose inspiration and instruction gave it initial impulse."  She also acknowledges debt to Aristotle, John Milton, and Jacques Maritain.   It discusses the medieval liberal arts education based upon grammar, logic, and rhetoric.

Books and writings

Published books
Textbook: The Trivium in College Composition and Reading

Coauthored book

Other writings

See also 
Classical education movement

1898 births
1982 deaths
American educational theorists
20th-century American educators
20th-century American Roman Catholic nuns
Columbia University alumni
Saint Mary's College (Indiana) faculty
Shakespearean scholars
20th-century American non-fiction writers
20th-century American women writers
American religious writers
Women religious writers
American women non-fiction writers